The Transmitter Solt is a radio transmission facility for 540 kHz MW (Medium Wave) near Solt, Hungary, serving as the primary transmitter site for Kossuth Rádió. With an output power of 2000 kW (2 MW), it is the most powerful radio transmitter in Europe and is among the most powerful radio transmitters in the world. Its intended broadcast area covers the Hungarian-speaking territories of Central- and Eastern Europe, however successful reception of the Kossuth Rádió was reported from as far as Michigan, United States and Kuala Lumpur, Malaysia. It uses a 303.6-metre tall guyed mast. The transmitter site (including all its original equipment) has been a preserved industrial monument since 2013.

Location 
Transmitter Solt is located in the Great Hungarian Plain, 4 km north from Solt and 80 km south from Budapest.

History 
By the early 1970s, interference from the increasing number of powerful MW transmitters across Europe rendered the Lakihegy Transmitter inadequate to provide the required coverage (covered approximately 50% of the territory of Hungary in 1972) so the Magyar Posta (Hungarian Post) and the central government decided to build a new transmitter with improved characteristics. The high priority project involved Hungarian, Polish and Soviet engineers from several companies and organizations. Construction works started in 1974, with several farmhouses and barns having been demolished on the intended site.

The transmitter was completed in 1977 and went on air the same year. It underwent a substantial renovation and equipment modernisation in 2017.

Equipment
The original 1977 transmitter was made of two identical, Soviet-made vacuum tube based 1000 kW units, combined for the required 2000 kW output power. It was replaced in 2017 by a solid state Nautel NX2000 consisting of five DRM-enabled NX400 units combined for 2000 kW output. The original vacuum tube transmitter (being a preserved industrial monument) remains on site as a functional backup unit.

See also
Kossuth Rádió
Lakihegy Tower
List of masts
List of European medium wave transmitters
List of tallest structures in Hungary

References 

 Press photos on the webpage of the operator (Antenna Hungária Zrt.)
 
 

Radio masts and towers in Hungary
Towers in Hungary
Hungary–Soviet Union relations
Hungarian People's Republic
Industrial archaeological sites in Hungary
Towers completed in 1977
Buildings and structures in Bács-Kiskun County
1977 establishments in Hungary